Yap Catholic High School, also referred to as YCHS,  is a private, four-year, Catholic, Jesuit university preparatory school serving young men and women in the State of Yap, Federated States of Micronesia. YCHS was established in 2011 and operated by the USA East Province of the Society of Jesus. YCHS is located in Lamer Village, Rull Municipality, State of Yap, Federated States of Micronesia. Its campus has 8.9 hectares (22 acres) of space.

As a relatively young university preparatory school, a large percentage of YCHS alumni are currently studying in universities either within in the FSM or overseas. Countries where the alumni are currently studying include the FSM, Japan, the United States including its Pacific territory of Guam, and the Philippines.

Academic curriculum 
As a university preparatory school, YCHS had developed an academic curriculum that is able to equip its students for university entrance and career as well as prepare students in terms of their spiritual formation in the Catholic faith. For four years, all students are required to take courses in the Catholic religion, mathematics, science, English language arts, social studies andliterature.

Additional courses also offered at YCHS include supplemental math review, algebra review, silent reading, physical education, art, student skill building, computer literacy, health, SAT preparation and college counseling.

Students at YCHS take the SAT offered by the College Board as the university entrance examination of choice.

Finances 
The YCHS monthly tuition rate is $70 with the full-year tuition rate, which includes the Summer Session tuition, as $700. However, YCHS does offer financial assistance options to students and families in need.

See also 
 Education in the Federated States of Micronesia

References

External links
 Yap Catholic High School

Schools in the Federated States of Micronesia
Yap
Catholic secondary schools in Oceania
2011 establishments in the Federated States of Micronesia
Educational institutions established in 2011